Ann Cathrin Eriksen (born 9 September 1971) is a former Norwegian team handball player and Olympic medalist. She received a bronze medal at the 2000 Summer Olympics in Sydney with the Norwegian national team. She played 127 matches for the national team during her career, and scored 119 goals.

References

External links

1971 births
Living people
Sportspeople from Bodø
Norwegian female handball players
Olympic bronze medalists for Norway
Olympic handball players of Norway
Handball players at the 1996 Summer Olympics
Handball players at the 2000 Summer Olympics
Olympic medalists in handball
Medalists at the 2000 Summer Olympics